Frank Clark Prescott (November 15, 1859 - January 6, 1934) was a Republican politician who served in the California State Assembly from the 76th district from 1903 to 1907 and served as its Speaker  from 1905 to 1906. He served in the United States Army during the Spanish–American War.

References

American military personnel of the Spanish–American War
20th-century American politicians
Republican Party members of the California State Assembly
1859 births
1934 deaths